Stylianos Kyriakidis (born 15 February 1942) is a Greek sailor. He competed in the Flying Dutchman event at the 1960 Summer Olympics.

References

External links
 

1942 births
Living people
Greek male sailors (sport)
Olympic sailors of Greece
Sailors at the 1960 Summer Olympics – Flying Dutchman
Sailors (sport) from Athens